The long-tailed thrush (Zoothera dixoni) is a species of bird in the family Turdidae. It is found from the central and eastern Himalayas to south-central and south-western China. Its natural habitats are subtropical or tropical moist montane forests and subtropical or tropical high-altitude shrubland.

The scientific name, Zoothera dixoni, is named after ornithologist Charles Dixon.

References

long-tailed thrush
Birds of North India
Birds of Nepal
Birds of Bhutan
Birds of Central China
Birds of Yunnan
long-tailed thrush
long-tailed thrush
Taxonomy articles created by Polbot